The OVP was a submachine gun developed in Italy.

Development 
The Italians were among the first armies ever to adopt a submachine gun, or more correctly, a light automatic gun firing a pistol cartridge. This was the Villar Perosa made by Officine di Villar Perosa (OVP). That ceased to be a service weapon in 1918, but the mechanism was a sound design and shortly after the end of the war, OVP were asked to produce a more practical weapon. The resultant weapon was the OVP submachine gun.

History 
The OVP was little more than the barrel and action of the VP attached to a wooden buttstock and provided with a trigger and some small refinements.

Although formally classed as a delayed blowback, the delay is minimal and certainly had little practical effect as seen by the high rate of fire. The mechanism is the usual one of bolt and return spring, but the bolt is controlled by a track in the receiver body that causes the bolt to rotate 45 degrees as it closes. The striker carries a lug bearing on the receiver track that also bears on a cam face on the bolt, so that the firing pin, driven by the return spring, cannot go forward to fire the cartridge until the bolt has rotated. When the gun is fired, recoil of the cartridge case moves the bolt back, causing it to rotate to the unlocked position, during which movement the pin is withdrawn by the action of the bolt's cam surface. Once unlocked the bolt is free to recoil and complete the firing cycle.

An unusual feature of the OVP that was not on the original VP gun was the use of a cylindrical sleeve surrounding the receiver for cocking the weapon. This was grasped and pulled to the rear to retract the bolt and then pushed forward during firing. Another oddity, this time carried over from the VP, was the provision of a slot in the rear edge of the top mounted magazine that allowed the firer to see how many rounds remained inside it. However, this also allowed dust and dirt to enter the magazine.

The OVP was issued in the early 1920s and by the time of World War II had been largely replaced by the various Beretta models. However the OVP saw use in the Abyssinian war and was used in small numbers by some Italian units in the Western Desert in 1941. After this it appears that the weapon was withdrawn from service and surviving specimens of this weapon are rare.

References

World War II infantry weapons of Italy
World War II submachine guns
Submachine guns of Italy